The Naval Aircraft Factory N-1 or Davis Gun Carrier was a 1918 maritime patrol aircraft built by the Naval Aircraft Factory (NAF), the in-house aircraft production arm of the United States Navy. A floatplane of biplane configuration with a single Liberty L-12 engine driving a pusher propeller, it was the first aircraft to be both designed and built by the NAF, and was designed to carry the Davis gun, the first recoilless gun. The first prototype crashed during its maiden flight due to poorly designed floats but was rebuilt. However, the aircraft's performance did not meet expectations, and navy leaders canceled the program after 2 of the 4 prototypes were subsequently damaged in serious crashes.

Specifications

References

Bibliography

External links

1910s United States patrol aircraft
Cancelled military aircraft projects of the United States
Naval Aircraft Factory aircraft
Single-engined pusher aircraft
Floatplanes
Biplanes
Aircraft first flown in 1918